Aporosa bourdillonii is a species of plant in the family Phyllanthaceae. It is endemic to India (Southern Western Ghats (Kerala)). It prefers evergreen and semi-evergreen forests.

References

External links
 http://indiabiodiversity.org/species/show/7728
 http://www.biotik.org/india/species/a/aporbour/aporbour_en.html

Flora of India (region)
bourdillonii
Endangered plants
Taxonomy articles created by Polbot